Cheryl Artise Gray Evans (born 1968, New Orleans, Louisiana) is an American lawyer and politician. She represented District 5 in the Louisiana State Senate prior to her resignation in 2009. She formerly served in the Louisiana House of Representatives (District 98).

Background
After finishing Eleanor McMain Magnet Secondary Senior High School in New Orleans, Gray proceeded to Stanford University, where she was a member of the track team and Delta Sigma Theta, receiving her baccalaureate degree in 1990. She then returned to New Orleans and received her Juris Doctor from the Tulane University Law School in 1993.

She practiced law with New Orleans' Gray & Gray Law Firm, which was started by her parents.

Political career
Gray Evans is a confidant with the reform faction of the Orleans Parish Democratic Party—the element frequently identified with the Black Organization for Leadership Development (BOLD) political organization which inexorably competes against William J. Jefferson and his Progressive Democrats. Gray Evans defeated one of Jefferson's daughters, Jalila Jefferson-Bullock, for the Senate District 5 seat vacated by the term-limited Diana Bajoie, Jefferson's successor in the state Senate. She is a critic of the Federal Emergency Management Agency's handling of recovery from Hurricane Katrina.

Personal life
Gray Evans' official state senate résumé lists a host of achievements, activities, awards, and memberships. She attends Asia Baptist Church in New Orleans and is married to former New Orleans television and radio news anchor/reporter Patrick Evans, who once served as Communications Director to New Orleans Mayor Ray Nagin.

Toward the end of 2009 Cheryl Gray Evans resigned from the legislature to join her husband, who had begun serving on active duty in Connecticut as a public affairs officer in the Navy.

References

1968 births
African-American state legislators in Louisiana
African-American women in politics
Baptists from Louisiana
Delta Sigma Theta members
Lawyers from New Orleans
Living people
Democratic Party Louisiana state senators
Democratic Party members of the Louisiana House of Representatives
Politicians from New Orleans
Stanford Cardinal women's track and field athletes
Stanford University alumni
Tulane University alumni
Tulane University Law School alumni
Women state legislators in Louisiana
21st-century African-American people
21st-century African-American women
20th-century African-American people
20th-century African-American women